Luellia is a genus of corticioid fungi in the family Hydnodontaceae. The genus contains three species found in Europe and North America.

References

Trechisporales
Trechisporales genera